Fallopia convolvulus, the black-bindweed or wild buckwheat, is a fast-growing annual flowering plant in the family Polygonaceae native throughout Europe, Asia and northern Africa.

Synonyms include Polygonum convolvulus L. (basionym), Bilderdykia convolvulus (L.) Dumort, Fagopyrum convolvulus (L.) H.Gross, Fagopyrum carinatum Moench, Helxine convolvulus (L.) Raf., Reynoutria convolvulus (L.) Shinners, and Tiniaria convolvulus (L.) Webb & Moq. Other old folk names include bear-bind, bind-corn, climbing bindweed, climbing buckwheat, corn-bind, corn bindweed, devil's tether, and wild buckwheat.

Description
The alternate triangular leaves are 1.5–6 cm long and 0.7–3 cm broad with a 6–15 (–50) mm petiole; the basal lobes of the leaves are pointed at the petiole. The flowers are small, and greenish-pink to greenish white, clustered on short racemes. These clusters give way to small triangular achenes, with one seed in each achene. The flowers have 5 sepals, the 3 outer ones are larger and show a keel. It has 5 stamens and the fruit grows to 4 mm long.

While it superficially resemble bindweeds in the genus Convolvulus there are many notable differences; it has ocrea (stipule-sheath at nodes), which Convolvulus does not; and Convolvulus has conspicuous trumpet-shaped flowers while Black-bindweed has flowers that are unobtrusive and only about 4 mm long.

Distribution and habitat
Fallopia convolvulus grows most commonly on disturbed or cultivated land, in northern Europe typically on warm, sunny, well-drained sandy or limestone soil types, but in hotter, drier areas like Pakistan, on moist shady sites. It ranges from sea level in the north of its range, up to 3600 m altitude in the south in the Himalaya.

Cultivation and uses
The seeds are edible, and were used in the past as a food crop, with remains found in Bronze Age middens. The seeds are too small and low-yielding to make a commercial crop, and it is now more widely considered a weed, occurring in crops, waste areas and roadsides. It can be a damaging weed when it is growing in a garden or crop, as it can not only damage the plants around which it twines, but also clog the machinery used to harvest a given crop. It is also an invasive species in North America.

References

convolvulus
Flora of Asia
Flora of Africa
Flora of Europe
Plants described in 1753
Taxa named by Carl Linnaeus